Events in the year 1890 in Japan.

Incumbents
Monarch: Emperor Meiji
Prime Minister: Yamagata Aritomo

Governors
Aichi Prefecture: Baron Takatoshi Iwamura then Kojiro Iwasaki
Akita Prefecture: Kojiro Iwasaki then Baron Akira Suzuki  
Aomori Prefecture: Masa Sawa
Ehime Prefecture: Katsumata Minoru
Fukui Prefecture: Toshitsuna Adashi 
Fukuoka Prefecture: Yasujo
Fukushima Prefecture: Nobumichi Yamada 
Gifu Prefecture: Toshi Kozaki
Gunma Prefecture: Sato Atasesan 
Hiroshima Prefecture: Nabeshima Miki
Ibaraki Prefecture: Sadanori Yasuda 
Iwate Prefecture: Shoichiro Ishii 
Kagawa Prefecture: Yawara Shibahara 
Kochi Prefecture: Baron Hiroi Hirotake
Kumamoto Prefecture: Takaaki Tomioka 
Kyoto Prefecture: Baron Kokudo Kitagaki
Mie Prefecture: Shangyi Narukawa
Miyagi Prefecture: Matsudaira Masanao 
Miyazaki Prefecture: Takayoshi Kyoganu 
Nagano Prefecture: Baron Utsumi Tadakatsu 
Niigata Prefecture: Senda Sada Akatsuki 
Oita Prefecture: Ryokichi Nishimura 
Okinawa Prefecture: Kanji Maruoka
Osaka Prefecture: Sutezo Nishimura
Saga Prefecture: Sukeo Kabayama
Saitama Prefecture: Eitaro Komatsubara 
Shiname Prefecture: Sada Kotedayasu
Tochigi Prefecture: Orita Hirauchi
Tokyo: Marquis Shigeru Hachisuke then Tomita Tetsunosuke
Toyama Prefecture: Fujishima Masaki then Fujishima Masaki 
Yamagata Prefecture: Hasebe Ren

Events
February unknown date – Kubota founded in Nishi-ku, Osaka. 
July 1 – 1890 Japanese general election;  Empire of Japan’s first general election for members of the House of Representatives of the Diet of Japan. It was the first example of a popularly elected national assembly in Asia 
November 25 – The first Diet session is held.
Unknown date – Ōshita Kaishunō, as predecessor of Fumakillar, an insecticide manufacturing and sales brand, founded in Hiroshima.

Births
January 15 – Michiaki Kamada, admiral (d. 1947)
January 28 – Fusako, Princess Kane, seventh daughter of Emperor Meiji (d. 1974)
September 30 – Chieko Higashiyama, film actress (d. 1980)
November 3 – Yamakawa Kikue, activist, writer, socialist, and feminist (d. 1980)

Deaths
January 23 – Joseph Hardy Neesima, educator (b. 1843)
June 2 – Matsudaira Yoshinaga, daimyō (b. 1828)

References

 
1890s in Japan
Japan
Years of the 19th century in Japan